Brian R. Gaines (born c. 1938) is a British scientist, engineer, and Professor Emeritus at the University of Calgary.

Biography 
Gaines received his Bachelor of Arts, Master of Arts and Doctor of Philosophy from Trinity College, Cambridge, and he is a Chartered Engineer, and Chartered Psychologist.

His previous positions include Professor of Industrial Engineering at the University of Toronto, Technical Director and Deputy Chairman of the Monotype Corporation, and Chairman of the Department of Electrical Engineering Science at the University of Essex. He was formerly Killam Memorial Research Professor, Dean of Graduate Studies, Associate Vice-president (Research) and Director of the Knowledge Science Institute at the University of Calgary.

He was president of the Society for General Systems Research in 1979. He is Fellow of the Institution of Electrical Engineers, the British Computer Society and the British Psychological Society.

He has been editor of the International Journal of Human-Computer Studies and of Knowledge Acquisition, and of the Computers and People and the Knowledge-Based Systems book series.

Work 
Gaines' research interests have included modelling the socioeconomic infrastructure of information technology, human–computer interaction, cognitive psychology, and systems theory.

Gaines is one of the pioneers in what is known as stochastic computing, a term he used first to characterise the highly attractive field when working at the Standard Telephones and Cables Ltd. (STL) in search of computational processors capable of learning during the 1960s.

Guy André Boy said of Gaines' role in the development of the field of knowledge acquisition:

Publications 
He has authored over 450 papers and authored or edited at least 11 books on a wide variety of aspects of computer and human systems. His books include:
 1977. Fuzzy automata and decision processes. Edited with Madan M. Gupta and George N. Saridis.
 1981. Fuzzy reasoning and its applications. Edited with E.H. Mamdani.
 1984. Fuzzy sets and decision analysis. Edited with H.J. Zimmermann and L.A. Zadeh.
 1984. Art of computer conversation: a new medium for communication. With Mildred L.G. Shaw.  
 1988. Knowledge acquisition for knowledge-based systems. Edited with J.H. Boose.
 1988. Knowledge acquisition tools for expert systems. Edited with J.H. Boose.
 1988. European Knowledge Acquisition Workshop: Proceedings of the European Knowledge Acquisition Workshop (EKAW'88) 19–23 June 1988. Edited with John Boose and Marc Linster. 
 1990. Machine learning and uncertain reasoning. Edited with J. H. Boose.
 1992. Proceedings of the European Knowledge Acquisition Workshop (EKAW'91) 20–24 May 1991. Edited with Mark Linster.
 1997. Artificial intelligence in knowledge management: papers from the 1997 AAAI Symposium, 24–26 March, Stanford, California. Edited with Mark A. Musen and Ramasamy Uthurusamy.
 2013. Cognitive ergonomics: understanding, learning, and designing human–computer interaction. Edited with Pierre Falzon and Andrew F. Monk.

See also 
 Personal construct theory
 Universal logic

References

External links 

 
  (links to some of his publications in the field of knowledge management)
  (links to some of his publications in the field of systems theory)
  (paper by Gaines and Shaw for the Fourth International World Wide Web Conference, 1995)

1938 births
British computer scientists
Living people
British systems scientists
Fellows of the British Computer Society
Academic staff of the University of Calgary
Alumni of Trinity College, Cambridge
Academic staff of the University of Toronto
Academics of the University of Essex
Fellows of the Institution of Electrical Engineers
Fellows of the British Psychological Society
Presidents of the International Society for the Systems Sciences